Schloßvippach is a municipality in the Sömmerda district of Thuringia, Germany.

References

External links
 

Sömmerda (district)
Grand Duchy of Saxe-Weimar-Eisenach